George Holcombe (March 1786 – January 14, 1828) was an American physician and politician who served as a United States representative from New Jersey.

Early life and education
Born in what was then Amwell Township (now in part of Lambertville in Hunterdon County, New Jersey) he completed preparatory studies and graduated from Princeton College in 1805. He attended the medical department of the University of Pennsylvania at Philadelphia and later studied medicine in Trenton.

Holcombe was granted a license by the Medical Society of New Jersey and practiced medicine in Allentown from 1808 to 1815.

Career
Holcombe held several local offices and was a member of the New Jersey General Assembly in 1815 and 1816. He was elected as Democratic-Republican to the Seventeenth Congress, elected as a Jacksonian Democratic-Republican to the Eighteenth Congress, and reelected as a Jacksonian to the Nineteenth and Twentieth Congresses, and held office from March 4, 1821, until his death in Allentown in 1828. Holcombe's remains were interred in the Congressional Cemetery.

See also
List of United States Congress members who died in office (1790–1899)

References

1786 births
1828 deaths
People from Allentown, New Jersey
People from Lambertville, New Jersey
Politicians from Hunterdon County, New Jersey
Princeton University alumni
Perelman School of Medicine at the University of Pennsylvania alumni
Members of the New Jersey General Assembly
Burials at the Congressional Cemetery
Democratic-Republican Party members of the United States House of Representatives from New Jersey
Jacksonian members of the United States House of Representatives from New Jersey
19th-century American politicians